Robert Hauschild Liebeck is an American aerodynamicist, professor and aerospace engineer. Until retiring from his position as senior fellow at the Boeing Company. in 2020, he oversaw their Blended Wing Body ("BWB") program. He has been a member of the National Academy of Engineering since 1992, where he is an AIAA Honorary Fellow, the organization’s highest distinction. He is best known for his contributions to aircraft design and his pioneering airfoil designs known as the "Liebeck Airfoil". Since his retirement he remains active in aviation industry associations and continues to teach at UCI.

Education
Liebeck pursued studies in aerospace engineering at the University of Illinois at Urbana–Champaign. He graduated with a Bachelor of Science in 1961, a Master of Science in 1962 and a PhD in 1968. It was while pursuing his PhD that he produced the first airfoil designs that would come to be known as the "Liebeck Airfoil".

Career
Liebeck worked summers at the Douglas Aircraft Company, located in Santa Monica, California, until he joined the permanent staff in 1968. He remained with the company after its merger with McDonnell Douglas, which later merged with Boeing in 1997. He has managed several of Boeing's airplane programs through which several advanced-concept aircraft were designed. As Senior Technical Fellow of the Boeing Company, he served as program manager of the company's blended wing body program.

Designs

Liebeck airfoils
Designs made by Liebeck during research for his doctoral thesis "Optimization of Airfoils for Maximum Lift", have been applied to the design of high-altitude aircraft. This class of airfoils has been used by NASCAR in its Car of Tomorrow which debuted in 2007.

Blended wing body
Boeing has invested in a blended wing body airplane program since 1993, a program which Liebeck managed. Run through Boeing's Phantom Works division, the program researched, designed and prototyped new aircraft designs which would reduce energy consumption and noise production. Initially funded by a grant from NASA of $90,000, the aircraft design moves away from the usual tube-and-wing design and instead has the wings blended into the body. This design was developed by Liebeck, in conjunction with other members of the research team. Liebeck's team released a remote-driven model, the X-48, in 1997, flight tested a three-engine version, the X-48B, in 2008-9 and a two-engine version, the X-48C in 2013.

Other designs
Liebeck's designs include propellers, wind turbines. wings for racing cars that have won the Indianapolis 500 and the Formula One World Championship, the wing for NASCAR's "Car of Tomorrow," the keel for the America³ yacht which won the 1992 America's Cup, and the wing for a World Championship aerobatic airplane

Teaching career

Liebeck has lectured in aerodynamics and aircraft design courses at several universities. Since 1995 he has been a Professor of the Practice of Aerodynamics at the Massachusetts Institute of Technology where he lectures in aeronautics. Since 2000, Liebeck has also been an adjunct professor at the University of California, Irvine. He was also an adjunct professor teaching aerodynamics, flight mechanics and airplane design at the University of Southern California from 1977 to 2000.

Awards and recognition
Liebeck was presented with the Brigadier General Charles E. "Chuck" Yeager International Aeronautical Achievement Award in 2012. In 2011 Liebeck was inducted into the Hall of Fame at the College of Engineering at Illinois, an honor which "recognizes Illinois engineering alumni, and others affiliated with the college, who have made significant achievements in leadership, entrepreneurship, and innovation of great impact to society". That same year he was presented with "Engineering the Future" award from the Henry Samueli School of Engineering for his work in aeronautics and contributions to the school.

Liebeck's awards and honors include:

2010 AIAA Honorary Fellow
2010 Daniel Guggenheim Medal for "distinguished engineering as evidenced by the conception and development of Liebeck airfoils and blended wing body aircraft."
1992 Member of the National Academy of Engineering for the development of high-lift, high-performance airfoils.
Royal Aeronautical Society Fellow
ASME Spirit of St. Louis Medal
ICAS Innovation in Aerodynamics Award
AIAA Wright Brothers Lecture
AIAA Aircraft Design Award
AIAA Aerodynamics Award

Publications

References

Aircraft designers
American aerospace engineers
Living people
Grainger College of Engineering alumni
University of California, Irvine faculty
MIT School of Engineering faculty
Engineers from California
Year of birth missing (living people)